Uta Fritze-von Alvensleben is a German astrophysicist awarded the German Physical Society's Hertha-Sponer prize in 2003 for her work on the evolution of galaxies.

Career 
Uta finished her PhD on comparing spectrophotometric models of nearby galaxies with experimental redshift survey results in 1989.

In 2005, she became a member of the Observing Program Committee for the European Southern Observatory (ESO). She was jointly responsible for assigning telescope time to different scientists for each of the eight large ESO telescopes in Chile.

After this, she worked at the University of Hertfordshire as part of the GALEV research group.

She has been working at the University of Göttingen since 2008 where she has worked on the Göttingen Evolutionary Synthesis Code for the unified spectral, chemical and cosmological evolution of galaxies.

She remains a member of the International Astronomical Union.

Publications 
The most widely cited work she co-authored is about improving the GALEV model by adding gaseous emissions and line emissions. She improved the model so it could simulate younger galaxies.

As of May 2020, the paper has 184 citations.

References 

Living people
German astrophysicists
Women astrophysicists
20th-century German physicists
20th-century German  women scientists
21st-century German women scientists
German women physicists
20th-century German astronomers
21st-century German astronomers
Academic staff of the University of Göttingen
Academics of the University of Hertfordshire
1955 births